Asgard or Asgardarchaeota is a proposed superphylum consisting of a group of archaea that includes Lokiarchaeota, Thorarchaeota, Odinarchaeota, and Heimdallarchaeota. It appears the eukaryotes emerged within the Asgard, in a branch containing the Heimdallarchaeota. This supports the two-domain system of classification over the three-domain system.

Discovery and nomenclature
In the summer of 2010, sediments were analysed from a gravity core taken in the rift valley on the Knipovich ridge in the Arctic Ocean, near the Loki's Castle hydrothermal vent site. Specific sediment horizons previously shown to contain high abundances of novel archaeal lineages were subjected to metagenomic analysis.

In 2015, an Uppsala University-led team proposed the Lokiarchaeota phylum based on phylogenetic analyses using a set of highly conserved protein-coding genes. Through a reference to the hydrothermal vent complex from which the first genome sample originated, the name refers to Loki, the Norse shape-shifting god. The Loki of mythology has been described as "a staggeringly complex, confusing, and ambivalent figure who has been the catalyst of countless unresolved scholarly controversies", analogous to the role of Lokiarchaeota in the debates about the origin of eukaryotes.

In 2016, a University of Texas-led team discovered Thorarchaeota from samples taken from the White Oak River in North Carolina, named in reference to Thor, another Norse god.

Additional samples from Loki's Castle, Yellowstone National Park, Aarhus Bay, an aquifer near the Colorado River, New Zealand's Radiata Pool, hydrothermal vents near Taketomi Island, Japan, and the White Oak River estuary in the United States led researchers to discover Odinarchaeota and Heimdallarchaeota, and following the naming convention having been established to use Norse deities, the archaea were named for Odin and Heimdallr, respectively. Researchers therefore named the superphylum containing these microbes “Asgard”, after the realm of the deities in Norse mythology.

Description 
Asgard members encode many eukaryotic signature proteins, including novel GTPases, membrane-remodelling proteins like ESCRT and SNF7, a ubiquitin modifier system, and N-glycosylation pathway homologs.

Asgard archaeons have a regulated actin cytoskeleton, and the profilins and gelsolins they use can interact with eukaryotic actins. In addition, Asgard archaea tubulin from hydrothermal-living Odinarchaeota (OdinTubulin) was identified as a genuine tubulin. OdinTubulin forms protomers and protofilaments most similar to eukaryotic microtubules, yet assembles into ring systems more similar to FtsZ, indicating that OdinTubulin may represent an evolution intermediate between FtsZ and microtubule-forming tubulins. They also seem to form vesicles under cryogenic electron microscopy. Some may have a PKD domain S-layer. They also share the three-way ES39 expansion in LSU rRNA with eukaryotes.

Metabolism

Asgard archaea are generally obligate anaerobes, though Kariarchaeota, Gerdarchaeota and Hodarchaeota may be facultative aerobes. They have a Wood–Ljungdahl pathway and perform glycolysis. Members can be autotrophs, heterotrophs, or phototrophs using heliorhodopsin. One member, Candidatus Prometheoarchaeum syntrophicum, is syntrophic with a sulfur-reducing proteobacteria and a methanogenic archaea.

The RuBisCO they have is not carbon-fixing, but likely used for nucleoside salvaging.

Eukaryotic-like features in subdivisions 
The phylum "Heimdallarchaeota" was found in 2017 to have N-terminal core histone tails, a feature previously thought to be exclusively eukaryotic. Two other archaeal phyla, both outside of Asgard, were found to also have tails in 2018.

In January 2020, scientists found Candidatus Prometheoarchaeum syntrophicum, a member of the Lokiarcheota, engaging in cross-feeding with two bacterial species. Drawing an analogy to symbiogenesis, they consider this relationship a possible link between the simple prokaryotic microorganisms and the complex eukaryotic microorganisms occurring approximately two billion years ago.

Classification 
The phylogenetic relationship of this group is still under discussion.

Taxonomy
In the depicted scenario, the Eukaryota are deep in the tree of Asgard, and any of the Eukaryota is significantly closer related to the Heimdalarchaeota than e.g. the Lokiarchaeota are.

Some authors have suggested splitting Heimdallarchaeota into multiple groups (Hodarchaeota, Gerdarchaeota, Kariarchaeota and Heimdallarchaeota). Eukaryotes may be sister to the previous four groups and Wukongarchaeota, or to the entire Asgard archaea group. A favored scenario is syntrophy, where one organism depends on the feeding of the other. In this case, the syntrophy may have been due to the Asgard archaea having been incorporated in an unknown type of bacteria, developing into the Eukaryotic nucleus. An α-proteobacterium was incorporated to become the mitochondrion.

The currently accepted taxonomy is based on the List of Prokaryotic names with Standing in Nomenclature (LPSN) and National Center for Biotechnology Information (NCBI).

 Phylum ?"Freyrarchaeota" Caceres 2019 ex Xie et al. 2021
 Phylum ?"Friggarchaeota" Caceres 2019
 Phylum ?"Gefionarchaeota" Caceres 2019
 Phylum ?"Idunnarchaeota" Caceres 2019
 Phylum ?"Njordarchaeota" Xie et al. 2021
 Phylum ?"Sigynarchaeota" Xie et al. 2021
 Phylum ?"Tyrarchaeota" Xie et al. 2021

 Class "Sifarchaeia" Sun et al. 2021
 Order "Borrarchaeales" Liu et al. 2020
 Family "Borrarchaeaceae" Liu et al. 2020
 "Candidatus Borrarchaeum" Liu et al. 2020
 Order "Sifarchaeales" Sun et al. 2021
 Family "Sifarchaeaceae" Sun et al. 2021
 "Candidatus Sifarchaeum" corrig. Farag, Zhao & Biddle 2020

 Class "Wukongarchaeia" Liu et al. 2020
 Order "Wukongarchaeales" Liu et al. 2020
 Family "Wukongarchaeaceae" Liu et al. 2020
 "Candidatus Wukongarchaeum" Liu et al. 2020

 Class "Heimdallarchaeia"
 Order "Gerdarchaeales" (JABLTI01)
 Order "Heimdallarchaeales"
 Order "Hodarchaeales" Liu et al. 2020
 Family "Hodarchaeaceae" Liu et al. 2020
 "Candidatus Hodarchaeum" Liu et al. 2020
 Order "Kariarchaeales" Liu et al. 2020
 Family "Kariarchaeaceae" Liu et al. 2020
 "Candidatus Kariarchaeum" Liu et al. 2020

 Class "Jordarchaeia" Sun et al. 2021
 Order "Jordarchaeales" Sun et al. 2021
 Family "Jordarchaeaceae" Sun et al. 2021
 "Candidatus Jordarchaeum" Sun et al. 2021

 Class "Odinarchaeia" Tamarit et al. 2022
 Order "Odinarchaeales" Tamarit et al. 2022
 Family "Odinarchaeaceae" Tamarit et al. 2022
 "Candidatus Odinarchaeum" Tamarit et al. 2022

 Class "Baldrarchaeia" Liu et al. 2020
 Order "Baldrarchaeales" Liu et al. 2020
 Family "Baldrarchaeaceae" Liu et al. 2020
 "Candidatus Baldrarchaeum" Liu et al. 2020

 Class "Thorarchaeia"
 Order "Thorarchaeales"
 Family "Thorarchaeaceae" (MBG-B)

 Class "Hermodarchaeia" Liu et al. 2020
 Order "Hermodarchaeales" Liu et al. 2020
 Family "Hermodarchaeaceae" Liu et al. 2020
 "Candidatus HermodarchaeumHermodarchaeum" Liu et al. 2020

 Class "Lokiarchaeia" corrig. Spang et al. 2015
 Order "Helarchaeales"
 Order "Lokiarchaeales" Spang et al. 2015
 Family "Lokiarchaeaceae" Vanwonterghem et al. 2016
 "Candidatus LokiarchaeumLokiarchaeum" corrig. Spang et al. 2015 (MBGB, DSAG)
 Family "MK-D1"
 "Candidatus PromethearchaeumPromethearchaeum" corrig. Imachi, Nobu & Takai 2020

Asgard archaeal mobilome

Viruses 
Several family-level groups of viruses associated with Asgard archaea have been discovered using metagenomics. The viruses were assigned to Lokiarchaeia, Thorarchaeia, Odinarchaeia and Helarchaeia hosts using CRISPR spacer matching to the corresponding protospacers within the viral genomes. Two groups of viruses (called 'verdandiviruses') are related to archaeal and bacterial viruses of the class Caudoviricetes, i.e., viruses with icosahedral capsids and helical tails; two other distinct groups (called 'skuldviruses') are distantly related to tailless archaeal and bacterial viruses with icosahedral capsids of the realm Varidnaviria; and the third group of viruses (called wyrdviruses) is related to archaea-specific viruses with lemon-shaped virus particles (family Halspiviridae). The viruses have been identified in deep-sea sediments and a terrestrial hot spring of the Yellowstone National Park. All these viruses display very low sequence similarity to other known viruses but are generally related to the previously described prokaryotic viruses, with no meaningful affinity to viruses of eukaryotes.

Mobile genetic elements 
In addition to viruses, several groups of cryptic mobile genetic elements have been discovered through CRISPR spacer matching to be associated with Asgard archaea of the Lokiarchaeia, Thorarchaeia and Heimdallarchaeia lineages. These mobile elements do not encode recognizable viral hallmark proteins and could represent either novel types of viruses or plasmids.

See also
 List of Archaea genera

References

External links 
 Traci Watson: The trickster microbes that are shaking up the tree of life, in: Nature, 14 May 2019

Archaea
Superphyla